The Palm Springs Open was a golf tournament on the LPGA Tour, played only in 1953. It was played at the Tamarisk Country Club in Palm Springs, California. Jackie Pung won the event.

References

Former LPGA Tour events
Golf in California
Sports in Riverside County, California
Women's sports in California